Nicolas Filleul de La Chesnaye (1530, in Rouen – 1575) was a French poet. He was professor at the College of Harcourt, Eure where in 1563, he produced Achille (1563). His texts were used for the Ballet Comique de la Reine in 1581.

References

16th-century French dramatists and playwrights
16th-century French poets
Translators to French
Latin–French translators
Writers from Rouen
1530 births
1575 deaths